Dharmendra Kakarala (born 1981) is an Indian film editor who works in Telugu cinema. He is known for editing the film Prasthanam (2010).

Career
After few attempts of attending college for civil engineering, Dharmendra decided to study film making, at Satyajit Ray Film and Television Institute, in Kolkata. A 2004 graduate from the film institute, he worked as an associate editor for films like Andhrudu (2005), Oka V Chitram (2006), Rakhee (2006), Lakshmi Kalyanam (2007), Chandamama (2007), Mestri (2009), and Bangaaru Babu (2009), before editing his debut film, Prasthanam (2010). This was written and directed by Deva Katta.

Filmography

 Prasthanam (2010)
 LBW: Life Before Wedding (2011)
 Dhada (2011)
 Vennela 1 1/2 (2012)
 Routine Love Story (2012)
 Mallela Theeram Lo Sirimalle Puvvu (2013)
 Chandamama Kathalu (2014)
 Bangaru Kodipetta (2015)
 Asura (2015)
 Padesave (2016)
 Guntur Talkies (2016)
 Oka Manasu(2016)
 PSV Garuda Vega (2017)
 Hello (2017) (Sound Supervision) 
 Thipparaa Meesam (2018)
 Unpaused (2020)
 Cinema Bandi (2021)
 11th Hour (2021); web series
 Valliddari Madhya (2022)
 The Ghost (2022)

References

External links
 

1978 births
Living people
People from Eluru
Telugu film editors
Satyajit Ray Film and Television Institute alumni
Film editors from Andhra Pradesh